The Nyimba District is a district of Zambia, located in the Eastern Province. The capital lies at Nyimba. As of the 2010 Zambian Census, the district currently has a population of 99,159 people.

References

Districts of Eastern Province, Zambia